Yevgeni Gennadyevich Averyanov (born 31 March 1979) is a Russian football manager and a former player. He is an assistant coach of FC Ural Yekaterinburg.

Playing career
He made his professional debut in the 1996 Russian Third League for FC Trubnik Kamensk-Uralsky.

He then played for 11 seasons (more than 300 games in all competitions) for FC Ural Yekaterinburg. Even though the club spent 12 seasons in the Russian Premier League, Averyanov mostly represented it in the third-tier PFL. He retired relatively early due to injury.

Coaching career
On 8 August 2022, Averyanov was appointed caretaker manager of FC Ural Yekaterinburg.

References

External links
 Profile by Russian Premier League
 

1979 births
Sportspeople from Sverdlovsk Oblast
People from Kamensk-Uralsky
Living people
Russian footballers
Association football defenders
FC Ural Yekaterinburg players
Russian football managers
FC Ural Yekaterinburg managers
Russian Premier League managers